Manipur Dramatic Union (MDU) is the oldest theatre group in Manipur, India. It was established on 15 March 1931.

By March 2012, MDU had produced 198 long plays of various categories and 34 short plays in experimental format (total of 232 plays). MDU produces at least two new long plays and short play every year. MDU stages "Tikendrajit" in August, "Krishna Avataar" on Janmsatami and "Lamyanba Irabot" in September every year.

References
Pre 2nd World War Theatre in Manipur, ed. Y. Sadananda &Y. Munindro, Panthoibi Natya Mandir, 1999.
Manipur Dramatic Union, Ngarang Amashung Ngashi, ed Telem Upendra, MDU 2000.
100 Years of Manipuri Proscenium Arch Theatre, ed. L. Damodar, Dr. Lokendra Arambam, Dr. N. Premchand, Dept. of Art & Culture, Govt. of Manipur, 2002.
MDU-Platinum Jubilee Souvenir, ed. B. Jayantakumar Sharma, MDU, 2006.

Culture of Manipur
Theatres in India